The 2013 season is the Houston Dynamo's 8th competitive season in Major League Soccer, 8th year of existence as a football club, and their second consecutive season playing at BBVA Compass Stadium. They also competed in the CONCACAF Champions League, participating in the knockout phase of the 2012–13 campaign being eliminated by Santos Laguna in the quarterfinal 3–1 on Aggregate. They will be opening the 2013–14 group stage in late July or early August 2013.

During the 2013 season Houston suffered their first ever loss at BBVA Compass Stadium against Sporting Kansas City on May 12, 2013.

The Dynamo are entering the season as the two-time defending MLS Eastern Conference post-season champions and runners-up to the MLS Cup.

Squads

First-team squad

Updated on April 21, 2013

Source (Stats are for Major League Soccer Regular Season Only):

Statistics

Appearances and goals 

|}

Statistics current as of May 10, 2013
Source: Houston Dynamo Season Statistics

Top scorers

Club

Coaching staff
{| class="wikitable"
|-
!Position
!Staff
|-
|Head Coach|| Dominic Kinnear
|-
|Assistant coach &Reserve Team Manager||  Wade Barrett
|-
|Assistant coach &Reserve Team Manager||  Steve Ralston
|-
|Goalkeeper coach|| Tim Hanley
|-
|Head Athletic Trainer|| Theron Enns
|-
|Assistant Athletic Trainer|| Shane Caron
|-
|Director, Soccer Operations|| Nick Kowba
|-
|Equipment Manager|| Michael Porter
|-
|Director, Youth Development|| James Clarkson
|-
|Assistant director, Youth Development|| Eddie Robinson
|-
|Youth Development Coordinator|| Michael Fasching
|-
|U-18 assistant coach|| Scot Fraser
|-

Other information

 Gabriel Brener
|-
||President of Business Operations|| Chris Canetti 
|-

Transfers

In

Winter

Out

Winter

Pre-season and friendlies

Competitions

Overall

Major League Soccer

Eastern Conference

Supporters' Shield

Results summary

Results by round

Matches

U.S. Open Cup

MLS Cup Playoffs

Kickoff time for Knockout round is in CDT while rest of games are in CST.

Knockout round

Conference semifinals

Conference finals

CONCACAF Champions League

Group stage

Knockout phase

Quarterfinals

References 

Houston Dynamo FC seasons
Houston Dynamo
Houston Dynamo
Houston Dynamo